Florian Brungraber (born 29 September 1984) is an Austrian paratriathlete. He represented Austria at the 2020 Summer Paralympics and he won the silver medal in the men's PTWC event.

References

External links 
 
 Website Florian Brungraber

1984 births
Living people
People from Freistadt District
Austrian male triathletes
Paratriathletes of Austria
Paratriathletes at the 2020 Summer Paralympics
Medalists at the 2020 Summer Paralympics
Paralympic bronze medalists for Italy
Paralympic medalists in paratriathlon
Sportspeople from Upper Austria